Barry Alden French (February 12, 1922 – March 16, 1990) was an American football lineman who played at both the guard and tackle positions. He played college football for Purdue in 1941, 1942, and 1946, and professional football for the Baltimore Colts from 1947 to 1950 and the Detroit Lions in 1951.

Early years
French was born in 1922 at Chamberlain, South Dakota. He attended Washington High School in Sioux Falls, South Dakota, graduating in 1940. He enrolled at Purdue University and was awarded the freshman merit trophy at the close of spring football practice in 1941 He played at the tackle position for the Purdue Boilermakers varsity fotball team in 1941, 1942, and 1946. His college career was interrupted by service in the Army during World War II.

Professional football
In March 1947, he signed with the played professional football with the Baltimore Colts of the All-America Football Conference. He played at the tackle and guard positions for the Colts, starting all 14 games during the 1947 season. He missed the 1948 season after both bones in his left forearm were broken during training camp. He also missed part of the 1949 season when the same arm was rebroken in training camp.

He came back from the injuries, returning to the Colts for the last half of the 1949 season. In 1950, he started 11 games for the Colts. He concluded his pro football career in 1951, appearing in 12 games for the Detroit Lions.

French appeared in a total of 50 games for the Colts and Lions, including 29 as a starter.

Family and later years
French married Jeanne d' Arc Phillips in 1950. He died in 1990 in Vero Beach, Florida.

References

1922 births
1990 deaths
Baltimore Colts players
Purdue Boilermakers football players
Players of American football from South Dakota
People from Chamberlain, South Dakota
Baltimore Colts (1947–1950) players
Detroit Lions players